George Miller (October 24, 1922December 25, 2014) was an American politician who served as the mayor of Tucson, Arizona from 1991 until December 6, 1999. He was a member of the Democratic Party. He received both a bachelor's degree and master's degree in political science from the University of Arizona.

Miller served in the United States Marine Corps during World War II.  He was shot in the right leg during the Battle of Saipan.
Miller served on the Tucson city council for fourteen years prior to becoming mayor in 1991. After serving as mayor for two terms, Miller declined to run again, and was succeeded by Bob Walkup on December 6, 1999. At the time of his retirement Miller was Tucson's longest serving public official, having spent twenty-two consecutive years in office: fourteen years as a city councilman and eight as mayor.

After retiring from politics Miller began teaching political science at Tucson's Pima Community College. He contributed opinion pieces to the Arizona Daily Star on various topics including his support for the annexation of unincorporated areas north of Tucson. He died in a nursing home in Tucson on December 25, 2014.

References

Politicians from Detroit
University of Arizona alumni
Pima Community College faculty
Arizona city council members
Mayors of Tucson, Arizona
Arizona Democrats
1922 births
2014 deaths
United States Marines
United States Marine Corps personnel of World War II